This is a list of the complete squads for the 2010 Six Nations Championship, an annual rugby union tournament contested by the national rugby teams of England, France, Ireland, Italy, Scotland and Wales. Each country was entitled to name a squad of 39 players to contest the championship. They could also invite additional players along prior to the start of the championship while the coach could call up replacement players if squad members suffered serious injury.

All caps are as of the start of the tournament, and do not include appearances made during the competition.

England
Martin Johnson named a revised 32-man England squad for the 2010 Six Nations Championship. On 25 January, Cole, Mullan, Robshaw, Ward-Smith and Youngs were promoted to Senior EPS to provide injury cover for other players. Jamie Noon was called up to replace Dan Hipkiss due to injury ahead of the Ireland game, while Charlie Hodgson was brought in to provide cover. Ahead of the Scotland game, Fourie, Tindall, Morgan and Geraghty were called up to the squad.

Caps updated before the 2010 Six Nations Championship.

Head coach: Martin Johnson

France
Marc Lièvremont announced France's squad for the 2010 Six Nations on 20 January. Julien Pierre was called up to the squad as an injury replacement for the Scotland game, as was Yoann Maestri. Jean-Baptiste Élissalde was also ruled out of the clash against Scotland, Michalak was called up to replace him. With Luc Ducalcon ruled out of the game against Ireland, Jean-Baptiste Poux was called up to replace him. Sylvain Marconnet was ruled out of the game against Wales and was replaced by the uncapped Clement Baiocco. Fall was replaced by Marc Andreu for the Wales game. After Michalak tore his cruciate knee ligaments in a club game, Dimitri Yachvili was called up to replace him.
Caps updated before the 2010 Six Nations Championship.

Head coach: Marc Lièvremont

Ireland
Ireland named their squad for the 2010 Six Nations Championship. Geordan Murphy was called into the Ireland squad for the clash against England after Rob Kearney was ruled out.

Caps updated before the 2010 Six Nations Championship.

Head coach: Declan Kidney

Italy
On 7 January 2010 coach Nick Mallett announced a 30-man for the 2010 Six Nations Championship. Canavosio and Bernabo were called up for the clash against England due to injuries to Del Fava and Picone. Paolo Buso was called up to the squad for the Scotland game.

Caps updated before the 2010 Six Nations Championship.

Head coach: Nick Mallett

Scotland
Andy Robinson named his squad for the Six Nations on 20 January, while Welsh, Rennie, Blair and Thompson were invited to train with the squad. Back Row Scott Gray was called up to join the Scotland training camp. For the game against Wales several players were called up, including Blair, Cairns, R.Lamont and Walker. Additional players were called up for the Italy game, including MacLeod, Grant, Robertson and Webster. Players then to be selected to drop into the A team.

Caps updated before the 2010 Six Nations Championship.

Head coach: Andy Robinson

Wales
Warren Gatland named a 35-man squad for the 2010 Six Nations Championship. Scrum-halves Mike Phillips and Dwayne Peel were both left out due to injury. Ken Owens was called up to the squad to cover injury concerns at hooker. After Phillips and Peel recovered from injury they were recalled to the squad for the France match. Gareth Delve was called up to the squad ahead of the Ireland game, to cover for Ryan Jones.

Caps updated before the 2010 Six Nations Championship.

Head coach: Warren Gatland

References

External links
 RBS Six Nations Squad Index

2010
2010 Six Nations Championship